Palmiro Serafini (27 February 1945 – 28 December 2013) was an Italian ski mountaineer and cross-country skier.

Serafini was born in Pievepelago. He participated at the 1968 Winter Olympics, when he placed sixth together with Giulio de Florian, Franco Nones and Aldo Stella in the 4 × 10 kilometres relay event of cross-country skiing.  Together with the brothers Gianfranco and Aldo Stella he won the 1973 Trofeo Mezzalama ski mountaineering competition.

Further notable results 
 1967: 3rd, Italian men's championships of cross-country skiing, 15 km
 1968:
 3rd, Italian men's championships of cross-country skiing, 50 km
 3rd, Italian men's championships of cross-country skiing, 15 km

References

External links
 
 Palmiro Serafini 

1945 births
2013 deaths
Italian male ski mountaineers
Olympic cross-country skiers of Italy
Sportspeople from the Province of Modena
Italian male cross-country skiers
Cross-country skiers at the 1968 Winter Olympics